Laguna Azul (Spanish for "blue lake" or blue lagoon") may refer to:
 Laguna Azul (Bolivia), a lake in Bolivia
 Laguna Azul, the local name for Lake Sauce in Peru

See also 
 Blue Lagoon (disambiguation)